Kevin Hatchi (born 6 August 1981) is a French footballer who most recently played for FC Edmonton in the North American Soccer League.

Career

France

World Traveller
On 4 March 2009 the midfielder left R.A.E.C. Mons to join FC Seoul, the French player's contract with the Belgian club expired at the end of the season. He made his debut in FC Seoul at 2009 K-League opening match against Chunnam Dragons. He then signed for Astra Ploieşti in 2009 for one year.

On 10 February 2011, Hatchi signed a one-year deal with the Montreal Impact. He made his debut, and scored his first goal, for his new club on 16 April 2011, a 2-1 loss to the Carolina RailHawks. Hatchi was released by Montreal on 15 June 2011.

He joined FC Edmonton of the North American Soccer League on 17 November 2011.

References

External links

Profile
 

1981 births
Living people
AJ Auxerre players
Association football defenders
Expatriate footballers in South Korea
Expatriate soccer players in Canada
FC Edmonton players
FC Seoul players
FC Astra Giurgiu players
French footballers
Grenoble Foot 38 players
K League 1 players
Montreal Impact (1992–2011) players
North American Soccer League players
R.A.E.C. Mons players
Royal Excel Mouscron players
Footballers from Paris
Tours FC players
US Créteil-Lusitanos players